The European Physical Journal C (EPJ C) is a biweekly peer-reviewed, open access scientific journal covering theoretical and experimental physics. It is part of the SCOAP3 initiative.

See also
 European Physical Journal

References

Physics journals
Springer Science+Business Media academic journals
Publications established in 1998
English-language journals
Semi-monthly journals
EDP Sciences academic journals
Particle physics journals